NK may refer to:

Businesses
Imerys (Euronext ticker code NK)
Nordiska Kompaniet, a department store in Stockholm, Sweden
Northrup-King Seed Company
Spirit Airlines (IATA code NK)
NK.pl, a Polish school-based social networking service

Places
Nagorno-Karabakh Republic, a de facto state in the Nagorno-Karabakh region
Nikšić, Montenegro (license plate code NK)
North Kingstown, Rhode Island, United States
North Kingstown High School
North Korea, a common name for the Democratic People's Republic of Korea (DPRK)

Other uses
Naik (military rank), rank in certain South Asian armies
Natural killer cell, in medicine
Neturei Karta, a group of anti-zionist orthodox Jews
Neue Kerze aka new candle, an old photometric unit of luminous intensity
Nippon Kaiji Kyokai, a classification society
Norwegian krone, a currency
NK (singer), a Ukrainian singer
 NK, nogomentni klub, a football club in Croatian and Slovenian (e. g. NK Osijek, NK Maribor)